The Pripyat or Prypiat is a river in Eastern Europe, approximately  long. It flows east through Ukraine, Belarus, and Ukraine again, draining into the Dnieper.

Overview
The Pripyat passes through the exclusion zone established around the site of the Chernobyl nuclear disaster. The city of Pripyat, Ukraine (population 45,000) was completely evacuated after the Chernobyl disaster.

As of 2020, it is being dredged to enable the E40 waterway.

Location
The Pripyat begins on the Volyn Hill, between the villages of Budnik and Horn Smolars of Lyubomlsky District in Ukraine. After 204 km downstream, it crosses the border of Belarus, where it travels 500 km through Polesia, Europe's largest wilderness, within which lie the vast sandy wetlands known as the Pinsk marshes, a dense network of swamps, bogs, rivers and rivulets within a forested basin.  For the last 50 kilometers the Pripyat flows again in Ukraine and flows several kilometers south of Chernobyl into the Kyiv reservoir.

Geography

The length of the river is 775 kilometers. The area of the watershed is 114,300 km2. The Pripyat valley in the upper reaches is weak, in the lower reaches it is clearer. The cave is developed all along, allocating two super-floodplain terraces. The width of the floodplain in the upper course of 2–4 km and more, in some years, is flooded for several months. In the lower reaches, the width of the floodplain reaches 10–15 km. The channel in the upper canalized; below - winding, forms meanders, elders, many ducts (one of them is combined with the lake Nobel); there are sandy islands. The width of the river in the upper reaches is up to 40 m, on the average - 50–70 m, in the lower reaches 100 - predominantly 250 m, with the entrance to the Kyiv reservoir - 4–5 km. The bottom is sandy and sandy-spruce. The slope of the river is 0.08 m / km

Name etymology
Max Vasmer in his etymological dictionary notes that the historical name of the river mentioned in the earliest East Slavic document, Primary Chronicle is Pripet' and cites the opinion of other linguists that the name meant "tributary", comparing with Greek and Latin roots. He also rejects some opinions which were improperly based on the stem  -pjat', rather than original .

It might also derive from the local word pripech used for a river with sandy banks.

See also 
Pripyat (city)
Chernobyl disaster
Chernobyl Exclusion Zone
Dnieper–Bug Canal

Books
 (in Russian, English and Polish) Ye.N.Meshechko, A.A.Gorbatsky (2005) Belarusian Polesye: Tourist Transeuropean Water Mains, Minsk, Four Quarters,
 (in Belorussian, Russian and English) T.A.Khvagina (2005) POLESYE from the Bug to the Ubort, Minsk Vysheysha shkola, .

Notes

References
 Припять, Great Soviet Encyclopedia
 Pripyat // Dictionary of Contemporary Geographical Names / Rus. geogr. oh Moscow center; By common. Ed. acad. V. M. Kotlyakova. Institute of Geography, Russian Academy of Sciences. - Yekaterinburg: U-Factorium, 2006.
 Joint River Management Program. Final Report: River Pripyat Basin (February 2004)

External links 

 Pripyat: Radioactive pollution, 2003

Belarus–Ukraine border
Chernobyl Exclusion Zone
International rivers of Europe
Rivers of Belarus]
Rivers of Brest Region
Rivers of Gomel Region
Rivers of Ukraine